Lufang Township may refer to:

Lufang Township, Jiangxi (陆坊乡), a township in Jinxi County, Jiangxi, China
Lufang Township, Yunnan (炉房乡), a township in Qiaojia County, Yunnan, China

See also
Lu Fang (disambiguation)
Lufeng (disambiguation)